Ecsenius alleni, known commonly as the Allen's blenny, is a species of combtooth blenny in the genus Ecsenius. It is found in coral reefs in the eastern Indian ocean, specifically in western Australia. It can reach a maximum length of 3.4 centimetres. The blennies feed primarily off of plants and algae. The specific name honours the ichthyologist Gerald R. Allen.

References

alleni
Fish described in 1988
Taxa named by Victor G. Springer